Carabus vagans is a species of ground beetle in the Carabinae subfamily that could be found in France and Italy.

References

vagans
Beetles described in 1795
Beetles of Europe